Allison is an unincorporated community and census-designated place (CDP), which is located in Luzerne and Redstone townships in Fayette County, Pennsylvania, United States.

As of the 2010 census, the population was 625. The CDP includes the neighborhood of Allison Heights in Luzerne Township.

Dunlap Creek flows through the center of the CDP, forming the border between Luzerne and Redstone townships.

Demographics
Between the time of the 2010 and 2020 federal census counts, the population declined to 503.

References

Census-designated places in Fayette County, Pennsylvania
Census-designated places in Pennsylvania